The term regional road (or route) is used in a number of places to designate roads of more than purely local but less than national strategic importance in a country's highway network.

It is used formally and officially in reference to:

Regional road (Ireland)
Regional road (Italy)
Regional road (Ontario)
Regional route (South Africa)

See also
List of numbered roads in York Region (Canada)
Transport in Senegal